The Wilkes T. Thrasher Bridge is a 4-lane road bridge located in Chattanooga, Tennessee. It opened in 1955 and carries Tennessee State Route 153 over the Chickamauga Dam crossing the Tennessee River.

References

Bridges completed in 1955
Road bridges in Tennessee
Thrasher
Bridges over the Tennessee River
1955 establishments in Tennessee